The alternativa ("alternative"), in Spanish-style bullfighting, is the act by which a novillero is authorized to be considered a torero, so that he can alternate in bullfighting with other bullfighters of the same category, both in bullfighting on foot and on horseback.

From the point of view of anthropology, it can be considered that taking the alternativa is a rite of passage or transition in which the bullfighter completes one stage of his formation to start another in which he becomes a professional matador of bulls. This change becomes effective with the ritual or ceremony of the alternativa and in the symbolism of the presentation of the bullfighter in society, in which he dons the traje de luces ("suit of lights") embroidered in gold or silver, which only bullfighters wear. The rite is again verified when the bullfighter puts an end to the professional stage of his life and retires as a matador of bulls with the act or ritual of passage of cutting the ponytail.

References

Bullfighting